The strawberry darter (Etheostoma fragi) is a species of freshwater ray-finned fish, a darter from the subfamily Etheostomatinae, part of the family Percidae, which also contains the perches, ruffes and pikeperches. It is endemic to the eastern United States, where it occurs in includes upland headwaters of the Strawberry River in Arkansas.  It inhabits shallow gravel riffles, rocky runs, and pools of headwaters, creeks, and small rivers.

References

Etheostoma
Fish described in 1968